The Têt is the largest river in Pyrénées-Orientales, southwestern France. The Têt has its source at the foot of the Pic Carlit in the Pyrenees. It crosses the Pyrénées-Orientales département (Northern Catalonia) from West to East and ends in the Mediterranean Sea, near Perpignan.

Tributaries include 

 Riberole
 Carança
 Mantet
 Rotja
 Cady
 Castellane
 Lentillà
 Boulès
 Basse

Towns along the river 

 Mont-Louis (Montlluís)
 Olette (Oleta)
 Villefranche-de-Conflent (Vilafranca de Conflent)
 Prades (Prada de Conflent)
 Perpignan (Perpinyà)
 Ille-sur-Têt (Illa)

References

Rivers of France
0Tet
Rivers of Pyrénées-Orientales
Rivers of Occitania (administrative region)